The Community of the Sisters of the Love of God (SLG) is an Anglican religious order of contemplative nuns founded in 1906 within the Church of England. 

The community has always drawn upon Carmelite spirituality. 

The community is at the Convent of the Incarnation, Fairacres, Oxford, England. Formerly it had houses at Boxmoor, Hemel Hempstead in Hertfordshire, Burwash in East Sussex, and Staplehurst in Kent. The community planned a convent in the Holy Land in the 1930s, but this phase of work never came to fruition, owing to the outbreak of the Second World War.

The community has a small publishing house, SLG Press, which was founded in 1967 and produces a magazine twice a year, the Fairacres Chronicle, and short works on prayer and the spiritual life.

Notable people
Margaret Sampson (Sister Mary Clare), Mother Superior from 1954 to 1973
Benedicta Ward

References

External links
Official website
SLG Press - Christian spirituality and prayer

Anglican orders and communities
Carmelite spirituality
Christian organizations established in 1906
Anglican religious orders established in the 20th century
1906 establishments in England